The Montreux Convention Regarding the Abolition of the Capitulations in Egypt was an international convention concluded on May 8, 1937 that led to the abolition of the extraterritorial legal system for foreigners in Egypt, known as the capitulations. It was signed by the governments of Egypt, the United States of America, Belgium, the United Kingdom, Denmark, Spain (the Republican side in the civil war), France, Greece, Italy, Ethiopia, Norway, the Netherlands, Portugal and Sweden. It went into effect on October 15, 1937, and was registered in League of Nations Treaty Series on the same day.

Background
The capitulations system was introduced into Egypt in the 19th century as a result of pressure by foreign powers by the Egyptian people. After the First World War, a wave of nationalism was on the rise in Egypt, and the government, backed by the newly-established Wafd Party, put growing demands before the British government, which was in control of Egypt, to abolish the capitulations system and to place foreigners under the local Egyptian legal system. As a result, several foreign consular courts were abolished in 1920–1921, while their nationals were placed under British consular jurisdiction. That did not satisfy the demands of the Egyptian government regarding the total abolition of capitulations.

A new opportunity arose following the conclusion of the Anglo-Egyptian Treaty of 1936, when negotiations began to settle the abolition of capitulations in Egypt. That led to the conclusion of the convention.

Terms
The agreement provided for the total abolition of capitulations and the placing of foreigners in Egypt under the Egyptian legal system. The date set for the abolition of the consular courts was October 15, 1949, after a transition period of 12 years.

See also
Capitulations of the Ottoman Empire
Mixed Courts of Egypt

References

External links
 Text of the convention
 Yunan Labib Rizk, "The way to Montreux" Al-Ahram Weekly, Issue No. 676 (5 - 11 February 2004)
 Yunan Labib Rizk, "The end of the third reservation" Al-Ahram Weekly, Issue No. 764 (13 - 19 October 2005)

1937 in Egypt
 
Treaties concluded in 1937
Treaties of the Kingdom of Egypt
Legal history of Egypt
Treaties entered into force in 1937
League of Nations treaties
Treaties of the United States
Treaties of the United Kingdom
Treaties of Belgium
Treaties of Denmark
Treaties of the Second Spanish Republic
Treaties of the French Third Republic
Treaties of the Kingdom of Greece
Treaties of the Kingdom of Italy (1861–1946)
Treaties of the Ethiopian Empire
Treaties of Norway
Treaties of the Netherlands
Treaties of the Estado Novo (Portugal)
Treaties of Sweden
1937 in Switzerland
Treaties extended to Curaçao and Dependencies
Treaties extended to the Dutch East Indies
Treaties extended to Surinam (Dutch colony)
Treaties extended to the Faroe Islands
Treaties extended to Greenland
Treaties of Canada
Treaties of Australia
Treaties of New Zealand
Treaties of the Union of South Africa
Treaties of the Irish Free State
Treaties of British India
Diplomatic conferences in Switzerland